Project CARS is a motorsport racing simulator video game developed by Slightly Mad Studios and published and distributed by Bandai Namco Entertainment. It was released in May 2015 for Microsoft Windows, PlayStation 4, and Xbox One.

Gameplay

Features
There are 74 drivable cars, over 30 unique locations with at least 110 different courses, of which 23 are real, with the remainder being fictional. For licensing reasons, some tracks are codenamed using their geographic location. In addition to real world racing circuits and fictional kart circuits, there are two fictional point-to-point roads inspired by Côte d'Azur and California Pacific Coast.

Physics simulation
Project CARS is intended to represent a realistic driving simulation. In order to differentiate the game from the established industry leaders, Gran Turismo and Forza Motorsport, Slightly Mad Studios' aim is a "sandbox" approach that allows the player to choose between a variety of different motorsports paths and grants immediate access to all included tracks and vehicles. Project CARS portrays racing events spanning multiple days, progressing from shakedown and qualifying runs to the race itself, while changes in weather and lighting conditions are simulated dynamically.

The game adopts an improved version of the Madness engine, which was the basis for the Need for Speed: Shift titles. More processing power available in modern computers allows for the introduction of a dynamic tire model named "SETA", rather than the steady-state model based on lookup tables, as seen in previous generation simulations. To accommodate differing skill levels, Slightly Mad Studios offers gamers (with or without a digital wheel) various driver aids and input filtering methods.

Development
Project CARS, which stands for Community Assisted Racing Simulator, was made with a total sum of $5 million. Funding for the game was raised by the community and the developers themselves, without the financial aid of a traditional publisher. Through the purchase of Tool Packs players could contribute to development in roles including content creation, QA, and marketing media. Members gain special perks, depending on their purchased tool pack. Members will receive a share of game sales profits generated within the first three years after launch as compensation for their efforts, to be paid quarterly.

In addition to community feedback, Slightly Mad Studios have acquired the professional services of racing driver and Top Gears former The Stig, Ben Collins, Clio Cup and European Touring Car Cup racing driver Nicolas Hamilton, and former Formula Renault 3.5 and current WEC driver Oliver Webb. Cars in the console versions of the game are made from 60,000 polygons.

On 26 August 2012 support for the Oculus Rift virtual reality headset was announced on the official forums. The announcement stated that at least one Oculus Rift Development Kit has been ordered. Members of the project are able to follow a link referenced in the forum post to read more details.

Sony's PlayStation 4 virtual reality headset PlayStation VR will also be supported.

It was released on 7 May 2015 in Europe and 12 May 2015 in America for Microsoft Windows, PlayStation 4, and Xbox One, while the Linux version was first delayed to later in 2015 and eventually cancelled. Project CARS was also originally due for release on the PlayStation 3, Xbox 360 and Wii U, but it was later announced that these versions had been cancelled. On 18 February 2015 it was announced that Project CARS would be delayed until 2 April 2015 for Europe, and eventually confirmed to be released on 7 May 2015 in Europe and Australia; 8 May 2015 in the UK; and 12 May 2015 in North America.

On 12 May 2016, the game was updated for compatibility with the HTC Vive virtual reality headset.

Slightly Mad Studios announced via Twitter that the game would be delisted from all platforms, with all sales ending on 3 October 2022, due to expiring car and track licenses.

Cancellation of Wii U version
In May 2015, it was revealed that the Wii U version would be put on hold. Studio boss Ian Bell said that the game's latest build was struggling to run smoothly on Nintendo's platform – at a 720p resolution with a framerate of 23fps, and revealed that they are not allowed to release a game that is running below 30fps, but "finding that extra 25% frame time is currently looking impossible". In the official Forums he adds that the Wii U's market share was not worth the effort of porting. He explained that there was a possibility the game would be pushed for the Nintendo Switch, then known as the project NX. On 21 July 2015, Slightly Mad Studios informed the Nintendo Life news outlet that the Wii U version had been cancelled, with Ian Bell saying that the title was "simply too much" for the Wii U hardware to handle. Distribution partner Bandai Namco reaffirmed the cancellation. Despite Bell wishing to release the game on a Nintendo platform, in November 2016 it was confirmed that there were no plans for a Nintendo Switch port.

Release
Project CARS was released in different editions.

In addition to the standard version of the game, the Project CARS Limited Edition was released at Day One. This edition featured a book called "Project Cars: By Racers 4 Racers" and five extra cars: the Ford GT40 Mk IV, BMW M1 Procar, McLaren F1, Sauber C9 and the Mercedes-Benz AMG C63 Class Coupé DTM.

Moreover, the pre-order version of both Limited and standard edition featured the Modified Car Pack containing three bonus cars: the Ruf CTR3 SMS-R, Pagani Zonda Cinque Roadster and the Ariel Atom Mugen.

On 6 May 2016, Slightly Mad Studios released the complete edition of the game, titled Project CARS Game of the Year Edition. This version features all DLCs and free bonus content already released. Moreover, the complete version adds two new cars, the Pagani Zonda Revolución and the Pagani Huayra BC, and the Nürburgring Nordschleife in its 24-hour configuration.

On 3 October 2022, the game was delisted from digital storefronts due to expiring car and track licenses, although the game will remain playable for those who currently own it.

Downloadable content
The game was supported with both paid and free downloadable content (DLC) upon release. Project CARS was initially planned to follow the season-pass model but plans for that were replaced with a system called "On-Demand." On-Demand was described as allowing a "commitment to keeping Project CARS up-to-date with the greatest, freshest, and most critical content whilst also allowing players to pick and choose the cars & tracks they want - without being locked in to a pre-paid scheme."

The first DLC was the Limited Edition Upgrade, released in June 2015, which added five cars already featured in the Project CARS Limited Edition. It was followed by the Racing Icons Car Pack, Modified Car Pack (which was also available as bonus content for the pre-order version of the game) and Old vs New Car Pack, all of which added new cars to the game. Still in 2015, the developers released the Audi Ruapuna Speedway Expansion, Aston Martin Track Expansion and the Classic Lotus Track Expansion which added new cars and four new racetracks: Mike Pero Motorsport Park, the historic version of Hockenheimring and Silverstone, Rouen-Les-Essarts and a fictional track called "Mojave Test Track". The Japanese Car Pack added new cars from Toyota, Mitsubishi and Scion, while the Renault Sport Car Pack featured five new Renault cars. In 2016, Slightly Mad released the Stanceworks Track Expansion, which added a new fictional track  called "Bannochbrae" and the US Car Pack, which adds the Chevrolet Corvette C7.R and the Cadillac ATS-V.R GT3, together with the Dallara DW12 and the Ford Fusion stock car. The last DLC released in 2016 was the Pagani Nürburgring Combined Track Expansion. It added the bonus content featured in the Project Cars Game of the Year Edition.

Reception

Critical reception

Project CARS was generally well received upon release. Gaming critic Matthew Kato of Game Informer stated: "The game joins a sim-racing field alongside already-established competitors like Gran Turismo and Forza, but it also does things its own way, challenging the ways of the past." Destructoid Brett Makedonski praised the graphics and wrote: "One aspect of Project CARS that never fails to impress is its aesthetic. Everything is stunningly gorgeous at all times, even when the sun blinds you as you're trying to corner."

However, some complained of bugs, including PSU.com's Simon Sayers, who said: "During packed starting grids on some courses, they’ll bunch up around the first corner and get tangled up like novices holding up everyone behind them."

Sales
In the first week of physical sales in the UK, Project CARS sold 63 percent of its total on the PlayStation 4 console, with 31 percent on the Xbox One and 6 percent on the PC. By 5 June 2015, the game had sold one million copies. By October 2016, the game had sold 2 million units. The game was made free from February 16 - March 16, 2017 with the Xbox Games with Gold program.

Sequels

The sequel was announced on 22 June 2015. The sequel includes more tracks and modes such as rallycross. There are over 170+ cars at release and 60 locations all featuring Live Track 3.0 and a 24-hour day-night cycle. The sequel was released on 22 September 2017 and features new vehicle types and motorsport classes including Rallycross, IndyCar, and Oval. In May 2018, Slightly Mad Studios announced the mobile spin-off Project CARS GO, which is being developed by Gamevil. It will feature licensed cars and vehicle customisation, and released in March 2021. In 2020, Slightly Mad Studios announced Project CARS 3 which was released on August 28 of the same year.

References

External links
 
 
 

2015 video games
Bandai Namco games
Cancelled Linux games
Cancelled PlayStation 3 games
Cancelled Wii U games
Cancelled Xbox 360 games
HTC Vive games
Kart racing video games
Multiplayer and single-player video games
Oculus Rift games
PlayStation 4 games
Project CARS
Racing simulators
Slightly Mad Studios games
Video games developed in the United Kingdom
Video games scored by Stephen Baysted
Video games set in Australia
Video games set in Belgium
Video games set in California
Video games set in China
Video games set in the Czech Republic
Video games set in Dubai
Video games set in France
Video games set in Germany
Video games set in Ireland
Video games set in Japan
Video games set in Monaco
Video games set in New York (state)
Video games set in England
Video games set in Scotland
Video games set in Wisconsin
Video games set in Italy
Video games using PhysX
Windows games
Xbox One games